The 1993–94 Slovenian Third League was the second season of the Slovenian Third League, the third highest level in the Slovenian football system.
Radomlje merged with Dob before the season.

League standings

East

West

See also
1993–94 Slovenian Second League

References

External links
Football Association of Slovenia 

Slovenian Third League seasons
3
Slovenia